is a railway station located on the West Japan Railway Company (JR West) Tōkaidō Line (JR Kyōto Line) in Shimamoto, Mishima District, Osaka Prefecture, Japan.  The station was opened on March 15, 2008.

Layout
There is an island platform between two inner tracks on the ground. This makes trains on the outer tracks unable to make stop at the station. Ticket gates are located on the overbridge over the platform and tracks.

Bus terminal
On the east side of the station is a rotary which locates a bus stop. The bus stop serves several routes of Hankyu Bus.

Hankyu Bus:
Route 30 for Wakayamadai Center
Route 40 for Wakayamadai Center / for Shin-yamazakibashi via Hankyu Minase
Route 50 for Wakayamadai Center via Hankyu Minase

Around the station
The park has a monument of poetry by Emperor Meiji (calligraphy by Tōgō Heihachirō) among other monuments calligraphed by Nogi Maresuke and Konoe Fumimaro.

Minase Station on the Hankyū Kyoto Main Line is about 10 minutes walk from Shimamoto Station. Minase was the only one station in Shimamoto before Shimamoto Station opened.

History 
Shimamoto station opened on 15 March 2008.

Station numbering was introduced to the station in March 2018 with Shimamoto being assigned station number JR-A37.

Adjacent stations

References 

Stations of West Japan Railway Company
Tōkaidō Main Line
Railway stations in Osaka Prefecture
Railway stations in Japan opened in 2008